Taekwondo at the 2015 Pacific Games in Port Moresby, Papua New Guinea was held on July 16–17, 2015.

Medal summary

Medal table

Men's results

Women's Events

See also
 Taekwondo at the Pacific Games

References

2015
2015 Pacific Games
Pacific Games